Keephills Generating Station is a coal fired station operated by TransAlta, located near Keephills, Alberta, Canada. Unit 3 is a low emission station, which replaced the older Wabamun 4 station.

Description 
The station consists of the following units:
Unit 2 is a 420 MW unit operated and owned by TransAlta.
Unit 3 is a 463 MW unit, built as a joint venture between TransAlta and Capital Power Corporation. It came onstream in 2011. In 2019, TransAlta acquired full ownership of the unit. This unit is a supercritical boiler manufactured by Hitachi. The unit cost about $1.98 billion to build.

Unit 1 was retired on December 31, 2021.

The plant has two 138.6 m (455 ft) smokestacks.

See also 

 List of power stations in Canada
 List of largest power stations in Canada
 List of tallest structures in Canada

References

Natural gas-fired power stations in Alberta
Parkland County